Silao Vaisola Sefo (born 15 January 1979 in Lefaga) is a Samoan rugby union prop. He is a member of the Samoa national rugby union team and participated with the squad at the 2007 Rugby World Cup.He is also a Chief Executive Officer at the South Seas Healthcare serving the pacific islanders and many.  He holds three degrees as he has been a past graduate from the University of Otago.  Graduated with his Bachelor of Commerce majoring in Management, Tourism and Sports.

References

1979 births
Living people
Rugby union props
Samoan rugby union players
Samoa international rugby union players
People from A'ana
University of Otago alumni